Samah Selim is an Egyptian scholar and translator of Arabic literature. She studied English literature at Barnard College, and obtained her PhD from Columbia University in 1997. At present she is an associate professor at the Department of African, Middle Eastern, and South Asian Languages and Literatures at Rutgers, the State University of New Jersey. She has also taught at Columbia, Princeton and Aix-en-Provence universities.

Selim is the author of The Novel and the Rural Imaginary in Egypt, 1880-1985 (2004). She won the 2009 Banipal Prize for her translation of Yahya Taher Abdullah's The Collar and the Bracelet. She has also translated Neighborhood and Boulevard: Reading through the Modern Arab City by the Lebanese writer Khaled Ziadeh, and Memories of a Meltdown: An Egyptian Between Moscow and Chernobyl by Mohamed Makhzangi. Future releases include a translation of Miral al-Tahawy's Brooklyn Heights (end of 2011).

In 2011, Selim won the Arkansas Arabic Translation Award for her translation of Jurji Zaydan's novel Shajarat al-Durr, based on the life of the Mamluk sultana. She thus became the first person to win both the Banipal Prize and the Arkansas Prize for Arabic literary translation.

Bibliography

Author
 The Novel and the Rural Imaginary in Egypt, 1880-1985

Translator
 Yahya Taher Abdullah, The Collar and the Bracelet (2009 Banipal Prize winner)
 Khaled Ziadeh, Neighborhood and Boulevard: Reading through the Modern Arab City
 Mohamed Makhzangi, Memories of a Meltdown: An Egyptian Between Moscow and Chernobyl
 Jurji Zaydan, Shajarat al-Durr (2011 Arkansas Award winner)
 Miral al-Tahawy, Brooklyn Heights

See also
 List of Arabic-English translators

References

Egyptian scholars
Arabic–English translators
Egyptian translators
Barnard College alumni
Columbia University faculty
Rutgers University faculty
Princeton University faculty
Academic staff of the University of Provence
Living people
Year of birth missing (living people)